Robert Wynne (4 May 1761 – 31 May 1838) was an Irish Member of Parliament. He sat in the House of Commons of Ireland from 1789 to 1799, as one of the two MPs for Sligo Borough.

References
 

1761 births
1838 deaths
Members of the Parliament of Ireland (pre-1801) for County Sligo constituencies
Irish MPs 1783–1790
Irish MPs 1790–1797
Irish MPs 1798–1800